Disculicepitidae is a family of flatworms belonging to the order Cathetocephalidea. The family consists of only one genus: Disculiceps Joyeux & Baer, 1936.

References

Platyhelminthes